Andrew Jackson Junius was a carpenter, Baptist minister and state representative in Florida. He represented Jefferson County, Florida in the Florida House of Representatives in 1879.

See also
 African-American officeholders during and following the Reconstruction era

References

Members of the Florida House of Representatives
19th-century American politicians
African-American politicians during the Reconstruction Era
African-American state legislators in Florida
Jefferson County, Florida
Year of birth missing
Year of death missing